Neguri Gane is a 148 meter-skyscraper located in Benidorm, Spain. The 43 story building began construction in 1998, and was completed in 2002. Upon completion, it was Benidorm's largest building, having since been overtaken by Gran Hotel Bali, though the building is still the largest residential building in Benidorm, and all of Spain. The building was completed in the brutalist style.
It is named after the Neguri neighborhood of Getxo, in the Basque Country of Spain. It is the 13th tallest building in Spain.

See also
Skyscraper design and construction
List of tallest buildings in Spain

References

2002 establishments in Spain
Residential skyscrapers in Spain
Residential buildings completed in 2002
Buildings and structures in Benidorm